Stoyan Deltchev (born in Plovdiv, July 3, 1959) is a Bulgarian gymnast and Olympic champion. He competed at the 1980 Summer Olympics in Moscow where he received a gold medal in horizontal bar and a bronze medal in all-around individual.

He now owns a gymnastics school in Reno, Nevada.

References

External links

1959 births
Living people
Bulgarian male artistic gymnasts
Sportspeople from Plovdiv
Bulgarian emigrants to the United States
Gymnasts at the 1976 Summer Olympics
Gymnasts at the 1980 Summer Olympics
Olympic gymnasts of Bulgaria
Olympic gold medalists for Bulgaria
Olympic medalists in gymnastics
Medalists at the 1980 Summer Olympics
Medalists at the World Artistic Gymnastics Championships
European champions in gymnastics